David Kendall is an American television director, producer, writer for movies, and writer.

He has directed, produced, and written for a number of television series, namely Growing Pains, Boy Meets World, Smart Guy, Hannah Montana, Zoey 101, iCarly,  Victorious, Ned's Declassified School Survival Guide, Big Time Rush,  Imagination Movers, Melissa & Joey, among other series.

Kendall has also worked in films. He directed the 2005 film Dirty Deeds starring Milo Ventimiglia and Lacey Chabert, among other projects. He wrote the screenplays for the films The New Guy and Revenge of the Bridesmaids.

Kendall graduated from Wesleyan University in 1979, where he majored in both film studies and government.

References

External links

American film directors
American male screenwriters
American television directors
Television producers from Pennsylvania
American television writers
Living people
Writers from Philadelphia
Wesleyan University alumni
Place of birth missing (living people)
Year of birth missing (living people)
American male television writers
Screenwriters from Pennsylvania